Salma Youssef (born 29 December 1994 in Cairo) is an Egyptian professional squash player. As of February 2018, she was ranked number 223 in the world. She has competed in numerous professional PSA tournaments and won the 2018 Lagos International Squash Classic.

References

1994 births
Living people
Egyptian female squash players
Sportspeople from Cairo
21st-century Egyptian women